Alper Uçar (born 19 January 1985) is a Turkish former competitive ice dancer. With his skating partner, Alisa Agafonova, he competed at two Winter Olympics (2014 and 2018) and won eight international medals, including silver at the 2011 Winter Universiade and three medals on the ISU Challenger Series. They skated in the final segment at six European Championships and four World Championships.

Earlier in his career, Uçar competed in single skating. He is the 2005 Turkish national champion and a four-time junior national champion.

Career

Early years 
Uçar started skating in 1997, after the first ice rink opened in Ankara, Turkey. He competed in single skating until 2009. In 2001, he won the gold medal in the novice men's event at the Balkan Games. He then took gold at a competition in the Netherlands.

In 2009, at the age of 24, Uçar switched to ice dancing and teamed up with Jenette Maitz from the United States. They competed together in the 2009–2010 season, winning the Turkish national title and placing 26th at the 2010 World Championships. They were coached by Natalia Dubova and Oleg Voyko in Stamford, Connecticut.

First three seasons with Agafonova 
In 2010, Uçar teamed up with Ukraine's Alisa Agafonova to compete for Turkey. They won a silver medal at the 2011 Winter Universiade, skating in their first season together.

Agafonova/Uçar placed 26th at the 2012 European Championships in Sheffield, England, and 31st at the 2012 World Championships in Nice, France.

Agafonova/Uçar were originally coached by Natalia Dubova and Oleg Voyko in Stamford, Connecticut. They changed coaches in December 2012, deciding to join Alexander Zhulin and Oleg Volkov in Moscow, Russia. They placed 13th at the 2013 European Championships in Zagreb, Croatia, and 28th at the 2013 World Championships in  London, Ontario, Canada.

2013–2014 season 
Agafonova/Uçar began their season at the 2013 Nebelhorn Trophy, the final Olympic qualifying opportunity. By finishing 5th, they earned a spot for Turkey in the ice dancing event at the Olympics. They then won a silver medal at the 2013 NRW Trophy.

Agafonova/Uçar finished 17th at the 2014 European Championships in Budapest, Hungary. In February, the two competed at the 2014 Winter Olympics in Sochi, Russia; their short dance placement, 22nd, was insufficient to advance to the next segment. They qualified to the free dance and finished 20th overall at the 2014 World Championships, which took place in March in Saitama, Japan.

2014–2015 season 
In December, Agafonova/Uçar won silver at the Santa Claus Cup in Hungary. In January, they took silver at the Toruń Cup in Poland and placed 12th at the 2015 European Championships in Stockholm, Sweden. In March, they achieved their career-best world placement, 16th, at the 2015 World Championships in Shanghai, China.

2015–2016 season 
Making their Grand Prix debut, Agafonova/Uçar placed 7th at the 2015 Trophée Éric Bompard in November. In December 2015, the two moved to Bloomfield Hills, Michigan to work with Anjelika Krylova and Pasquale Camerlengo due to visa problems which were exacerbated following the 2015 Russian Sukhoi Su-24 shootdown.

They finished 12th at the 2016 European Championships in Bratislava, Slovakia, and 21st at the 2016 World Championships in Boston, United States.

2016–2017 season 
Agafonova/Uçar received two Grand Prix assignments; they placed 9th at the 2016 Skate America and 8th at the 2016 Rostelecom Cup. They ranked 11th at the 2017 European Championships in Ostrava, Czech Republic. It was the best continental result of their career.

The two finished 17th at the 2017 World Championships in Helsinki, Finland. Due to their result, Turkey qualified a spot in the ice dancing event at the 2018 Winter Olympics.

In March 2017, Uçar was elected to the ISU Athletes Commission as the ice dance representative.

2017–2018 season 

Agafonova/Uçar competed at two Grand Prix events and then won silver at the 2017 CS Tallinn Trophy. In January, they finished 13th at the 2018 European Championships in Moscow, Russia. In February, the two competed at the 2018 Winter Olympics and qualified to the final segment. They ranked 20th in the short dance, 18th in the free dance, and 19th overall in Pyeongchang, South Korea. They had the same result at the 2018 World Championships in Milan, Italy. They announced their retirement from competitive skating on March 25, 2018.

Post-competitive career 
In January 2019, Uçar moved to Estero, Florida, to coach at the Hertz Arena's International Skating Academy.

Programs

With Agafonova

With Maitz

Single skating

Competitive highlights 
GP: Grand Prix; CS: Challenger Series; JGP: Junior Grand Prix

Ice dancing with Agafonova

Ice dancing with Maitz

Single skating

References

External links 

 
 
 
 

Turkish male ice dancers
Turkish male single skaters
Figure skaters at the 2007 Winter Universiade
1985 births
Living people
Sportspeople from Denizli
Figure skaters at the 2014 Winter Olympics
Olympic figure skaters of Turkey
Universiade medalists in figure skating
TED Ankara College Foundation Schools alumni
Figure skaters at the 2018 Winter Olympics
Universiade silver medalists for Turkey
Competitors at the 2005 Winter Universiade
Competitors at the 2009 Winter Universiade